The list of ship launches in 1864 includes a chronological list of some ships launched in 1864.


References 

Sources

1864
Ship launches